The Grey Range is a low-lying range of hills located in the Australian state of Queensland.  The stretches from the west of Blackall of Central West Queensland in the north to Tibooburra in the far west of New South Wales.

The Yapunyah waterhole is a notable feature of the range.

Yaraka is located near the range.

History 
Kuungkari (also known as Kungkari and Koonkerri) is a language of Western Queensland. The Kuungkari language region includes the landscape within the local government boundaries of Longreach Shire Council and Blackall-Tambo Shire Council.

See also

List of mountains in Australia

References 

Grey Range – Queensland by Degrees. Royal Geographical Society of Queensland. Retrieved 4 March 2013.

Central West Queensland
Mountain ranges of Queensland